Alagebrium (formerly known as ALT-711) was a drug candidate developed by Alteon, Inc.   It was the first drug candidate to be clinically tested for the purpose of breaking the crosslinks caused by advanced glycation endproducts (AGEs), thereby reversing one of the main mechanisms of aging. Through this effect Alagebrium is designed to reverse the stiffening of blood vessel walls that contributes to hypertension and cardiovascular disease, as well as many other forms of degradation associated with protein crosslinking. Alagebrium has proven effective in reducing systolic blood pressure and providing therapeutic benefit for patients with diastolic heart failure.

Mechanism

AGEs are structures that form irreversibly when carbohydrates react non-enzymatically with proteins, lipids, or DNA. Many proteins, including structural proteins such as collagen and elastin, play an integral role in the architecture of tissues and organs and maintenance of cardiovascular elasticity and vascular wall integrity. Accumulation of these glycocedic cross-linkages can impair the normal function of organs, thicken arteries, stiffen muscles, or lead to other characteristic declines of biological aging. In addition to this, the formation of AGE crosslinks leads to increased stiffness and loss of function of tissues and organs, and abnormal protein accumulation, which together cause many of the complications of aging and diabetes. Diabetic individuals form excessive amounts of AGEs earlier in life than non-diabetic individuals. AGEs are also known to induce oxidative stress, in which reactive molecules provoke the underlying component of inflammation.

Pharmacologic intervention with alagebrium directly targets the biochemical pathway leading to the stiffness of the cardiovascular system. Removal of the AGEs by cleavage of the abnormal crosslinking bonds has been associated with diminished inflammatory and sclerotic signaling pathways. These pathways are responsible for the deposition of abnormal amounts of matrix proteins that physically stiffen tissues. The presence of AGE crosslinks also renders tissues and organs less susceptible to normal turnover thus enhancing the presence of these abnormal bonds on various molecules. Importantly, alagebrium does not disrupt the natural carbohydrate modification to proteins, intra-molecular crosslinking or peptide bonds that are responsible for maintaining the normal integrity of the collagen chain. Thus, normal structure and function is preserved while abnormal crosslinking is reduced.

Although alagebrium may break some important AGE crosslinks, there is no evidence that it is effective against the most prevalent crosslink: glucosepane.

Chemistry
The chemical name for alagebrium is 4,5-dimethyl-3-(2-oxo-2-phenylethyl)thiazolium chloride;  it has also been called dimethyl-3-N-phenacylthiazolium chloride.

History
Alteon said that it had selected ALT-711 as its lead AGE-breaker based on preclinical results in its annual report for the year 1997 and that it was preparing an IND filing.

The INN name was proposed in 2004 and recommended in 2005.

In 2006 Alteon merged with a company called HaptoGuard that had cash and a potential diagnostic test for haptoglobin; as part of the merger Genentech, which held preferred shares in Alteon, converted their shares to common ones and received the right to get milestone payments and royalties on sales of alagebrium, and option rights to license ALT-2074.  In 2007, the company changed its name to Synvista Therapeutics, Inc.  Synvista announced that it was terminating clinical trials of alagebrium in January 2009 in order to focus on the diagnostic test and another clinical candidate SYI-2074 (formerly ALT-2074).  The company seems to have discontinued operations and their website is no longer available.

See also 
 Glycation
 Glycosylation
 Glucosepane
 Advanced glycation end product

References

Post-translational modification
Thiazoles